Paragomphus cataractae is a species of dragonfly in the family Gomphidae. It is found in the Kunene River basin in parts of Namibia, Zambia and Zimbabwe. Its natural habitat is rivers. It is threatened by habitat loss.

References

Sources
 C.Michael Hogan. 2012. Kunene River. eds. P.Saundry & C.Cleveland. Encyclopedia of Earth. National Council for Science and the Environment. Washington DC.

Gomphidae
Taxonomy articles created by Polbot
Insects described in 1963